The Rose Theatre in downtown Bastrop in Morehouse Parish, Louisiana was built in 1927.  It was listed on the National Register of Historic Places on September 8, 1987.

It is a two-story Arts and Crafts-style brick building.  Its brickwork on its front facade was painted in a cream color in 1987 when the word "Rose", centered on the facade, was also repainted.  Its sides and rear are common bond brick.  Its auditorium has an upper gallery area which once served blacks separately.

See also
National Register of Historic Places listings in Morehouse Parish, Louisiana

References

National Register of Historic Places in Morehouse Parish, Louisiana
Theatres completed in 1927
Morehouse Parish, Louisiana
Theatres on the National Register of Historic Places in Louisiana